Cheek is an unincorporated community, southwest of Beaumont in central Jefferson County, Texas, United States. In 1906, it was established by John R. Cheek. Although an identifiable community remains with a population of 550, the area is included within  Beaumont city's jurisdiction.

Location
Cheek is located within Precinct 4 of Jefferson County.  Precinct 4 is divided into four zones.
Zone 1 and Zone 2 describe the area known as Cheek.
Zone 1
Boyt Road Area:
 Kidd Rd to Boyt Rd
 Boyt Rd from Blossom Rd to Deshotel Rd
 Martel Height Area:
 Lawhon Rd from Gums St to Bluebird Way
 Lawhon Rd from South China to Hwy 365
Zone 2 
Township of Cheek:
Blewett Rd from Avenue C to Industrial Rd

History
The Gulf & Interstate Railway Company, later amended to The Gulf & Interstate Railway Company of Texas, was chartered by C. J. and N. C. Jones on May 19, 1894. Its intent was to improve economic  development by connecting Port Bolivar, on one of the headlands to Galveston Bay, with the Red River. By 1896, the Gulf and Interstate Railroad to Beaumont stopped in Bolivar Point, allowing local farmers to ship their produce to market on iced rail cars. Previously, produce was taken to Galveston by boat. Trains connecting to Galveston were taken across the bay on a barge. The railway was completed only to Beaumont by 1897, according to Reed and Zlatkovich; although the hurricane in 1900 destroyed more than twenty-eight miles of the road between Beaumont and Port Bolivar, and it was repaired in 1904. 

In 1906, John R. Cheek established a stop for the Gulf and Interstate Railway to provide services for farmers and passengers midway between Beaumont and Winnie. The area was inhabited largely by rice farmers who used the Beaumont Irrigating Company's canal, which cut through Cheek and irrigated the surrounding farms. The Cheek Common School District, organized in 1907 and bolstered by the construction in 1939 of a new school building by the Public Works Administration. In 1912, J.R. Cheek supervised Cheek & Heyman Lumber Co as was common for leaders of railroad operations to also hold key positions at lumber mills of the time. By 1925, Cheek's population was estimated to be forty. The post office was discontinued in 1928. By the 1970s a large Goodyear and Gulfco plant were located nearby.

Religion
Cheek has hosted a variety of religious worship centers over the years.  New Bethel Baptist Church originating in 1957 and St. Martin de Porres Catholic Church originating in 1962 are two of the oldest establishments located in the heart of the community.  Currently, both congregations actively offer regular worship services and venues for special celebrations.

Education
Cheek Elementary School was supported by the local community in the 1940s and beyond as an independent school  district. The 
school served as a community center for the surrounding area.  Later Cheek School was incorporated into the South Park School District of Beaumont. The Cheek School no longer exists.

Primary education is provided by the following:
Hardin-Jefferson Independent School District for students in west and northwest regions 
Hamshire-Fannett Independent School District for students in south and southeast regions 
Beaumont Independent School District for students in north and northeast regions

Business economy
With large rice fields, cattle farmlands, and ever evolving natural resource extracting, Cheek is rich in resources. The community hosts a variety of businesses.
Goodyear Plant
Doug Nelson Café
Monument Constructors
Kidd Road Store
Gulf Coast Machine & Supply
Clark Pillow Co
Texas Coastal Credit Union

Law and government
Cheek is served by the Jefferson County Sheriff's Office.

Cheek Volunteer Fire Department And Ambulance Service is located at 8523 Kidd Rd and is operated by community leaders.

On April 9, 2002, Everette “Bo” Alfred was sworn in as Jefferson County Commissioner of Precinct 4, where Cheek is included as Zone 1 and Zone 2. Cheek hosts the Precinct 4 Service Center where the former Fanshire Elementary School was converted to meet the needs of the community.

Such services include:  
Maintenance of roads and bridges 
Constructing driveways and installing culverts 
Signage and striping of roads 
Ditching 
Grass cutting 
Elections 
Public health fair 
Southeast Texas Super Seniors
Summer nutrition program

Entertainment
There are often weekend events for everyone to enjoy.  Rodeos, Zydecos, and trail rides account for some of the areas larger gatherings and festivities where nationally renowned artists often join in the celebrations.

Local places of entertainment:
Laday Rodeo Arena
Bassett's Ranch
Crenshaw Old Barn Orchard
Clifton Steamboat Museum

References

http://www.co.jefferson.tx.us/prct4/page3.htm
https://web.archive.org/web/20160304053848/http://atsfrr.net/resources/welborn/spv0786.htm
http://www.treetexas.com/research/railroad/?action=view&cid=24
https://web.archive.org/web/20121102153630/http://www.co.galveston.tx.us/Museum/point_bolivar_history.asp
http://www.josephites.org/parish/tx/omom/story/
https://books.google.com/books?id=cy4wAQAAMAAJ&pg=PA162&lpg=PA162&dq=Gulf+and+Interstate+Railway+of+Texas+cheek&source=bl&ots=zMzfyhpXNC&sig=PSOpPZ7XwE2OSS_FuzdAgMEcoe0&hl=en&sa=X&ei=8hW2U4K-D4mSqAbBgIKgDQ&ved=0CDcQ6AEwAw#v=onepage&q=Gulf%20and%20Interstate%20Railway%20of%20Texas%20cheek&f=false

Unincorporated communities in Jefferson County, Texas
Unincorporated communities in Texas